The  was a four-ship class of gunboats of the early Imperial Japanese Navy.

Design and description
The Maya vessels were Japan’s first iron-hulled gunboats, although only  and  had true iron hulls.  had a composite hull construction, whereas  had a steel hull. All four vessels had auxiliary schooner-rigged sails.
They displaced  at normal load. The crew numbered about 104 officers and enlisted men.

Propulsion was by a coal-fired horizontal double-expansion reciprocating steam engine with two cylindrical boilers driving a double screw.

The Maya-class ships were initially intended to be armed with one Krupp  Krupp L/22 breech-loading gun, and one Krupp  L/22 breech-loading gun, with two quadruple 1-inch Nordenfelt guns as secondary armament. However, each ship later modified to carry different armament in 1906.

Two of the three vessels (Maya and Akagi) were built by the private-contractor, Onohama Shipyards in Kobe (a predecessor of Hitachi Zosen Corporation), and one (Chōkai ) was by built by the private-contractor Ishikawajima-Hirano Shipyards. Atago was built by the government’s Yokosuka Naval Arsenal

All four ships served in the First Sino-Japanese War of 1894-1895. In 1898, the ships were reclassified as second-class gunboats. Atago was lost in combat during the Russo-Japanese War in 1904. Maya and Chōkai were removed from the navy list in 1908 and were subsequently broken up in 1913. Akagi was removed from the navy list in 1911,  but survived under civilian ownership until 1953.

Ships

Notes

References

External links

 Materials of the Imperial Japanese Navy

Gunboat classes